Milen Lahchev (born 1 April 1987) is a former Bulgarian footballer and a current coach.

Career
Lahchev began his youth career at Germanea, but later moved to Marek Dupnitsa. His professional years were spent mainly at Vidima-Rakovski and Lokomotiv Sofia, for whom he played in the UEFA Europa League. Following brief stints at Montana and Romanian side Concordia, Lahchev returned to Marek in 2013, where he served as team captain.

In early 2017, without announcing that he is retiring as an active player, Lahchev, who holds a UEFA B Licence, left Marek to become head coach of Germanea.

Honours

Player
Vidima-Rakovski
Second League (1): 2009–10
Marek Dupnitsa
Second League (1): 2013–14

References

External links

1987 births
Living people
Bulgarian footballers
Bulgarian football managers
First Professional Football League (Bulgaria) players
Liga I players
PFC Marek Dupnitsa players
PFC Vidima-Rakovski Sevlievo players
FC Lokomotiv 1929 Sofia players
CS Concordia Chiajna players
FC Montana players
Expatriate footballers in Romania
Bulgarian expatriate sportspeople in Romania
Bulgarian expatriate footballers
Place of birth missing (living people)
Association football midfielders
People from Dupnitsa
Sportspeople from Kyustendil Province